Robinson's Requiem is a 1994 survival simulation video game developed and originally published by Silmarils exclusively in Europe for the Atari ST, Atari Falcon and Amiga. Taking place in the 22nd century where Earth and colonized planets are facing overpopulation, the game sees players assuming the role of Robinson officer Trepliev 1 from the Alien World Exploration department in his attempt to escape imprisonment from the fictional planet of Zarathustra alongside another AWE Robinson named Nina1, while facing several hostile creatures and dangers in order to survive.

Robinson's Requiem was developed in conjunction with Ishar 3: The Seven Gates of Infinity and made use of Silmarils' proprietary ALIS game engine. Though it was initially released for the Atari ST, Atari Falcon and Amiga microcomputer platforms, the game was later ported to other home computers and consoles including the PC, Macintosh, 3DO Interactive Multiplayer and Atari Jaguar CD, some of which were released by several publishers across multiple regions and each of which featured several changes and additions compared to the original versions. The Jaguar CD port was cancelled, but received a homebrew release in 2011 by Songbird Productions. A conversion for the Amiga CD32 was also planned but never released.

Robinson's Requiem has been met with mixed reception from critics since its initial release. The Atari ST and Atari Falcon versions received praise for their presentation, graphics, sound design and gameplay but received criticism for being difficult to newcomers, slow pacing and steep learning curve. Similarly, the Amiga version garnered praise for its graphics, sound and gameplay but was criticized by some for the low framerate and difficulty curve. The PC versions were met with a more divided reception from video game magazines and dedicated outlets who felt divided in regards to several aspects, including the level of complexity and difficulty for players. A sequel, Deus, was released in December 1996 only on PC. It has since been re-released on compilations for modern PC platforms through download services such as Good Old Games.

Gameplay 

Robinson's Requiem is a survival simulation game, similar to Wilderness: A Survival Adventure and UnReal World, that takes place from a first-person perspective where players assume the role of Robinson officer Trepliev 1 from the Alien World Exploration department in his attempt to escape from the prison planet Zarathustra alongside another AWE Robinson named Nina1 as the main objective, while facing several hostile creatures and dangers in order to survive the planet's hostile alien environment long enough. The players use the game's systems to monitor the Trepliev 1's health status, perform surgery and create makeshift tools. Players must also keep track of hunger, thirst, and fatigue temperature in addition to their character's health, which is displayed on its dedicated screen and multiple statuses are shown depending on the actions taken during gameplay. Many actions require the accomplishment of "every day" tasks such as eating, drinking, and sleeping, as well as hunting, cooking, gathering, and finding a place to rest. The player uses a freely movable mouse cursor to interact with the environment and with the icon-based interface on the heads-up display (HUD) when not engaged in combat.

Synopsis 
Robinson's Requiem takes place in the year 2163, where Earth and colonized planets are facing overpopulation by humans. A military force known as the Alien World Exploration (AWE) and its Robinsons explore potential planets across the universe that are suitable for colonization, requiring a rigorous training process and their task lasts for five years until their mandate is finished. However, a secret service organization known as Scientific Intelligence (SI) issued orders that certain Robinsons cannot return to Earth in order to avoid foreign viruses but officer Trepliev 1 and other Robinsons eventually discover the organization's actions. Trepliev 1 and his crew are tasked with exploring an unknown planet as their last mission before retiring but the team's spacecraft was sabotaged to crash-land on the location, which is revealed to be a prison planet called Zarathustra.

Development 

Robinson's Requiem was developed in tandem with Ishar 3: The Seven Gates of Infinity and made use of Silmarils' proprietary ALIS game engine created by the company's co-founder Louis-Marie Rocques, which allowed the team in porting the game more easily from Atari ST to other platforms. The project was headed and designed by Silmarils co-founder André Rocques, who also shared the role of programmer alongside his brother Louis-Marie, Jean-François Trevien and composer Fabrice Hautecloque. The artwork was created by artists Christophe Lambert, Eric Galand, Guillaume Maginot, Nicolas Meylaender and Pascal Einsweiler, among other people collaborating in its development.

The 3D landscapes in Robinson's Requiem are rendered using texture-mapped voxels, similar to NovaLogic's Comanche and its Voxel Space engine, while elevation value to represent a specific height from a flat terrain were pre-calculated with interpolation and features multiple special effects. The sprites were pre-rendered using 3D Studio.

David Ingels and Cyril Cogordan were responsible for porting Robinson's Requiem to the 3DO Interactive Multiplayer and the Atari Jaguar CD add-on respectively. When converting and testing the game on the Jaguar CD, Cogordan stated both on an interview and his personal web page that the system was not capable of rendering voxel visuals, an issue which Ingels also faced during the 3DO conversion process, prompting both programmers to display the visuals with texture-mapped polygons instead while writing the engine on each console as well. Cogordan was also responsible for adapting the title to Atari Falcon on CD-ROM and Macintosh.

Release and ports 

Robinson's Requiem was originally published by Silmarils exclusively in Europe for the Atari ST, Atari Falcon and Amiga in 1994. The Atari Falcon version was released in both diskettes and CD-ROM, with the latter featuring full motion video cutscenes. The game was later released for PC and Macintosh by ReadySoft in North America and Europe by Daze Marketing, featuring minimal changes compared to the original versions and has since been re-released on compilations for modern PC platforms through download services such as Good Old Games. The 3DO Interactive Multiplayer version was originally announced for a February 1995 release by ReadySoft, but due to extensive delays it was not released until 1996, only in North America, and became one of the last games released for the system. Though it features the same full motion video cutscenes as the CD-ROM release for Atari Falcon, the visuals are now rendered with polygons instead of voxels.

The Atari Jaguar CD version was first announced in late 1994 as one of the three titles Silmarils intended to release for the add-on, including its then-in development sequel Deus and Ishar 4: Ishar Genesis. The Jaguar CD port was initially intended to be published during the second quarter of 1995 but was later rescheduled for an August/Q3 1995 release instead. Despite being completed and sent to Atari Corporation for approval, it was never released due to Atari Corp. closing their doors as a result of the commercial and critical failure of the Atari Jaguar platform until it was picked up for distribution by Songbird Productions and released on 30 May 2011. As with the 3DO version, this version features the same FMV cutscenes and visuals are rendered with polygons instead of voxels. A version for the Amiga CD32 was in development by Silmarils and planned to be published in May 1994. However, it was never released for unknown reasons.

Reception 

Critical reception of Robinson's Requiem was mixed. Many reviewers noted its poor graphics and high system requirements, and some found the game to be boring. However, several critics, including those from CU Amiga and Amiga Computing, believed that the game's originality overrode other complaints.

CU Amigas Tony Dillon was impressed by its freeform item combination system, but was disappointed by the Amiga version's graphics and performance. However, he finished his review by saying, "If you want something new that will completely blow your brain, then this could well be the game for you". Jonathan Maddock of Amiga Computing also disliked the game's graphics and system requirements, but praised the game as "an entirely new gaming experience". Amiga Formats Dale Bradford noted that "just wandering around, exploring and discovering how long you can stay alive is enjoyable, thanks to the non-linear gameplay", and to the "care and thought" that went into the game. All three reviewers noted the game's high level of difficulty.

Rich Pelley of Amiga Power, however, found the game to be extremely boring; he likened playing it to "being told to paint a fence and [...] discover[ing that] it's fifteen miles long". He also criticized its graphics and performance, and noted that the game's survival systems amounted to "lots of bars and charts and electrocardiograms, and not much action". The game also received poor reviews from both PC Gamer UK and PC Gamer US, who found the game frustrating and uninviting, and criticized its graphics.

Legacy 
A sequel, Deus, had already been announced for the Atari Jaguar CD by the time Robinson's Requiem was released. It was released in 1996 on all regions only for PC to mixed reception.

Notes

References

External links 
 Robinson's Requiem at GameFAQs
 Robinson's Requiem at Giant Bomb
 Robinson's Requiem at MobyGames

1994 video games
3DO Interactive Multiplayer games
Amiga games
Amiga 1200 games
Atari Jaguar CD games
Atari ST games
Cancelled Amiga CD32 games
DOS games
Games commercially released with DOSBox
Classic Mac OS games
ReadySoft Incorporated games
Science fiction video games
Silmarils (company) games
Simulation video games
Single-player video games
Songbird Productions games
Survival video games
Video games developed in France
Video games scored by Fabrice Hautecloque
Video games set in the 22nd century
Video games set in the future
Video games set on fictional planets
Video games with 2.5D graphics
Video games with alternate endings
Video games with voxel graphics
Windows games